Hemky Madera (born January 26, 1977) is an American actor. He began his acting career in the Dominican Republic television production Grandes Series Dominicanas in which he took the leading parts of the mini-series En La Olla and Trio en Alta Mar, both by Dominican director/producer Alfonso Rodríguez. He also played Mr. Delmar in Spider-Man: Homecoming and Carlos in Netflix original  Kaleidoscope.

Life and career
Madera was born in Queens, to Luis and Gisela Madera. He was born prematurely when his mother came to visit relatives in New York, and his family then moved him back to Santiago, Dominican Republic. After college, he decided to act full-time and moved to New York City where he worked on the production of The Bookie's Lament (2000) with Gabriel Macht, but later returned to the Dominican Republic, where he starred in the mini-series Asalto en la Lincoln as well as in the sitcoms Ciudad Nueva and Los Electrolocos, in which he took the lead.

After returning to the United States, he has appeared in the feature films Dreaming of Julia (2003) with Harvey Keitel and Gael García Bernal, in The Lost City (2005) with Andy García, Dustin Hoffman, and Bill Murray, in The Wrath of Cain (2010) with Ving Rhames and Robert Patrick as well as doing voice work in Rango (2011) alongside Johnny Depp amongst others.

On stage, he first appeared in Pantallas at Santo Domingo's Great National Theater. In the United States he has appeared in Inverse Theater's production of Icarus and Aria and the New York Spanish Repertoire's production of Feast of the Goat as well as assorted other stage productions, i.e. Life is a Dream, The Mistress of the Inn, Chronicles of a Death Foretold, Blood Weddings, Midnight Brainwash Revival, Burning the Bridges, and Belisa's Capriciousness.

On television, he has appeared in single episodes of hit television series Law & Order: Criminal Intent, The Shield, Brothers & Sisters, My Name Is Earl, and The Good Guys as well as 17 episodes of Weeds as Mexican drug cartel criminal Ignacio, his best-known role. He also has a recurring role as a retired baseball player on the IFC TV series Brockmire.

He starred as Pote Gálvez in the USA Network television series Queen of the South. He was originally asked to audition for the role of the father but he knew that he was too young for the part. "But I said, 'Let me just do my best, and see what happens.'” A few days later, they called him in to audition for the role of Pote.

He had a minor role in Spider-Man: Homecoming, which Madera has stated was one of his favorite roles.

Filmography

References

External links

1977 births
Living people
American expatriates in the Dominican Republic
American male film actors
American male television actors
American male video game actors
American male voice actors
American people of Dominican Republic descent
Hispanic and Latino American male actors